Zenon Trzonkowski (19 September 1957 – 18 November 2021) was a Polish professional footballer who played as a defender and later coach and manager.

Playing career
Starting his career at Stal Brzeg Trzonkowski went on to play 34 matches in the top division for Śląsk Wrocław. He also played for their  reserves when they won promotion to the third division in 1982, before ending his career at rivals Zagłębie Lubin.

He ended his playing career aged 26 due to a career-ending knee injury.

Coaching and managerial career
Trzonkowski managed Śląsk's youth and reserve teams, and won promotion to the third division with the latter. In 1985 he was briefly manager of Odra Opole. He later also managed Karpaty Krosno and ended his career at home club, called BTP at the time.

References

1957 births
2021 deaths
Sportspeople from Lower Silesian Voivodeship
Polish footballers
Association football defenders
Ekstraklasa players
Śląsk Wrocław players
Zagłębie Lubin players
Polish football managers
Śląsk Wrocław managers
Odra Opole managers
Karpaty Krosno managers